Daniel Raphael Rossen (born August 5, 1982) is an American singer-songwriter and multi-instrumentalist. He is best known as the guitarist and co-lead vocalist of the indie rock band Grizzly Bear, with whom he has recorded four studio albums. Rossen is also a member of Department of Eagles, and released a solo EP, Silent Hour/Golden Mile, in 2012. His debut solo studio album, You Belong There, was released in 2022.

Biography
Originally from Los Angeles, Rossen moved to attend New York University. Rossen is the grandchild of filmmaker Robert Rossen, who directed The Hustler and All the King's Men. Robert Rossen's parents were Russian-Jewish immigrants. As a student at the university, Rossen formed Department of Eagles with roommate Fred Nicolaus in 2001. The duo then released two 7" singles and an album, The Whitey on the Moon UK, on Isota Records. About Department of Eagles early recordings, Rossen explains:

Rossen concurrently went on to join Grizzly Bear in 2005. He joined the group for their second album, Yellow House. On joining Grizzly Bear, Rossen notes:
 

Department of Eagles released their second record In Ear Park in October 2008. The album featured fellow Grizzly Bear bandmates Chris Taylor and Christopher Bear of Grizzly Bear, with Taylor co-producing. The album was dedicated to Rossen's late father, with whom Rossen shared memories of going to the titular park.

In 2012, Rossen released a solo EP, Silent Hour/Golden Mile. Rossen would embark on a belated tour for the EP in 2014 due to commitments to Grizzly Bear's fourth album, Shields, released the same year as the EP. Rossen released the 12" single Deerslayer for Record Store Day 2018, though the song has been in circulation since his 2014 solo tour, and was quietly released in 2017 via his website.

In 2019, Rossen would tease songs for a potential debut solo album on his Instagram page. Again in 2021, Rossen continued to tease work on the album through Instagram, with Christopher Bear confirming his involvement via his own Instagram.

Rossen in 2020 performed an untitled song for Vote Ready, a livestream concert, which featured music from Bear, though also in a solo performance. Rossen appeared on the fourth Fleet Foxes album, Shore, contributing to its penultimate track, once again with Bear who contributed drums and percussion to all but five tracks of the album.

On January 20, 2022, Rossen announced his debut solo album You Belong There, released on April 8, 2022, supported by a tour of North America and Europe.

Discography

Solo
Studio albums
 You Belong There (2022)

EPs
Silent Hour/Golden Mile EP (2012)

Singles
"Deerslayer" (2018 exclusive single for Record Store Day)

With Grizzly Bear 
 Yellow House (2006)
Friend EP (2007)
 Veckatimest (2009)
 Shields (2012)
Shields: B-Sides (2013)
 Painted Ruins (2017)

With Department of Eagles 
 The Whitey on the Moon UK LP (2003) / *The Cold Nose  (2005 UK reissue of The Whitey on the Moon UK LP)
 In Ear Park (2008)

References

1982 births
Living people
New York University alumni
American singer-songwriters
American folk rock musicians
Indie folk musicians
Psychedelic folk musicians
American people of Russian-Jewish descent
21st-century American singers
21st-century American guitarists
Grizzly Bear (band) members